The Nenagh Guardian is a weekly local newspaper that circulates in County Tipperary, Ireland. The newspaper is based in Nenagh, County Tipperary, but is printed by the Limerick Leader in Limerick. The title incorporates two previous local papers, the Tipperary Vindicator and the Nenagh News.

The current editor is Garry Cotter.

The newspaper is printed (but not owned) by Celtic Media Group.

References

External links

Mass media in County Tipperary
Nenagh
Newspapers published in the Republic of Ireland
Weekly newspapers published in Ireland
Newspapers established in 1838
1838 establishments in Ireland